Landon Wilson (born March 13, 1975) is an American former professional ice hockey right winger who last played for the Texas Stars of the AHL, where he served as team captain. He is the son of former NHL forward Rick Wilson.

Early life
Landon Wilson was born on March 13, 1975, in St. Louis, Missouri. At the time, his father Rick Wilson was in the first of his two seasons playing for the St. Louis Blues. The Wilson family went on to move eight times over the next 18 years as a result of Rick's playing career and coaching career. As a youth, Wilson played in the 1989 Quebec International Pee-Wee Hockey Tournament with a minor ice hockey team from Oyster Bay, New York.

By 1989, the Wilson family settled in the Los Angeles, California, area where Rick spent three seasons on the coaching staff of the Los Angeles Kings from 1989 to 1992. Landon spent his first three years of high school at El Segundo High School, where he played football quarterback and led the high school to league championships in 1990 and 1991. While living in the Los Angeles area, Landon also played hockey for the Junior Kings, who won the national 17-and-under championship in 1992.

London's father was hired as an assistant coach with the Minnesota North Stars in 1992, and Landon gave up a promising senior year of football at El Segundo due to his family's move to Minnesota. As a result of the move, Landon decided to focus on hockey rather than football during his senior year of high school.

Instead of moving with his parents to Eden Prairie, Minnesota, Landon moved to a boarding house in Iowa and joined the Dubuque Fighting Saints of the junior United States Hockey League. Wilson finished his senior year of high school at Dubuque Senior High School while playing for the Fighting Saints.

Playing career
Wilson was drafted 19th overall in the 1993 NHL Entry Draft by the Toronto Maple Leafs. Wilson made his NHL debut with the Stanley Cup winning Colorado Avalanche in the 1995–96 season. However, he didn't play enough games to qualify for engraving his name into the Stanley Cup. Wilson has also played for the Boston Bruins, Phoenix Coyotes and Pittsburgh Penguins. Wilson has played 375 career NHL games, scoring 53 goals and 66 assists for 119 points.

While playing with the Coyotes in December 2002, Wilson received a partially blinding eye injury in one eye when a flying puck collided with his eye while he was not wearing a visor. He missed the rest of the season, but was able to return the next year with a visor which he wore for the rest of his career.
In 2004–05, he played for Espoo Blues in Finland. After that he moved to Switzerland to play with HC Davos. After one season in Davos he moved to HC Lugano.

On July 3, 2008, Wilson returned to North America and signed with the Dallas Stars. He was then reassigned to Grand Rapids Griffins of the American Hockey League to start the 2008–09 season.

Career statistics

Regular season and playoffs

International

Awards and honors

References

External links

1975 births
Living people
American men's ice hockey right wingers
Boston Bruins players
Colorado Avalanche players
Cornwall Aces players
Dallas Stars players
Dubuque Fighting Saints players
Espoo Blues players
Grand Rapids Griffins players
HC Davos players
HC Lugano players
Ice hockey people from St. Louis
National Hockey League first-round draft picks
North Dakota Fighting Hawks men's ice hockey players
Phoenix Coyotes players
Pittsburgh Penguins players
Providence Bruins players
Springfield Falcons players
Texas Stars players
Toronto Maple Leafs draft picks